Adékúnlé is a name of Yoruba origin, meaning "the crown or royalty fills up the (family) house."

Notable people with the name includes:

Given name 
 Adekunle Adejuyigbe, Nigerian filmmaker and producer
 Adekunle Adesoji, Nigerian Paralympic sprinter
 Adekunle Adeyeye (born 1968), Nigerian academic and university administrator
 Adekunle Adeyoola, Nigerian gospel rap artist, actor, and businessman
 Adekunle Akinlade (born 1969), Nigerian politician
 Adekunle Fajuyi (1926–1966), Nigerian Army officer and martyred military governor of Western Nigeria
 Adekunle Gold (born 1987), Nigerian musician
 Adekunle Lawal (1934–1980), Nigerian military officer and former Governor of Lagos State
 Adekunle Lukmon (born 1984), Nigerian footballer
 Adekunle Ojora (born 1932), Nigerian businessman
 Michael Adekunle Ajasin (1908–1997), Nigerian politician

Surname 
 Benjamin Adekunle, Nigerian Army officer who led the successful assault on Biafra in the Nigerian Civil War
 Prince Adekunle, Nigerian musician

References 

Yoruba given names
African masculine given names
Yoruba-language surnames